Joop Burgers (born 25 April 1940) is a Dutch footballer. He played in one match for the Netherlands national football team in 1965.

References

1940 births
Living people
Dutch footballers
Netherlands international footballers
Footballers from Amsterdam
Association football midfielders
AFC DWS players
HFC Haarlem players